Changjiang Subdistrict is a subdistrict of Yuhua District, Shijiazhuang, Hebei, People's Republic of China, located just within the 2nd Ring Road in the northern part of the city. , it has 1 residential community and 4 villages under its administration.

See also
List of township-level divisions of Hebei

References

Township-level divisions of Hebei